is a 1950s Japanese manga series by Osamu Tezuka. It was published by Shueisha in the Omoshiro Book as a supplement. The same company published Lion Books II in Weekly Shōnen Jump in the 1970s, which would commonly be referred to as The New Lion Books.  The series was partially adapted into an experimental anime series in the 1980s and 1990s.

1950s manga series
There are no continuations or relations between any of the stories.

1970s manga series
There are no continuations or relations between any of the stories.

Anime adaptations
Two of the stories in the manga were adapted into an experimental anime series titled the Lion Books collection. The original concept was to make 26 new anime episodes and canvass them for sale without any broadcast contract with TV stations. The first adaptation came in 1983 using the story "The Green Cat". It is regarded as the first attempt to produce an original video animation release on October 10, 1983. If the episode was finished independently on October 10, 1983 with no other episodes to follow in production, it very well could have been qualified as the first anime OVA. Because there is uncertainty as to whether the VHS was actually available for sale at the production end date, Dallos is credited to be the first official OVA released by the industry. The Green Cat is known to be screened in the "4th Tezuka Osamu Fan Club Meeting" on October 10, 1983.

The second story "Adachi-ga Hara" was adapted in 1991, and became the only movie in the series to be released to theaters. Four other stories were filled in from non-manga sources. The series was re-released as a DVD on March 21, 2003. It is also available on the streaming service Viki. The five first episodes were directed by Osamu Tezuka himself, while the last, shown at a Hong Kong Film Festival, was the first anime directed by his son Makoto Tezuka.

See also
List of Osamu Tezuka manga
List of Osamu Tezuka anime
Osamu Tezuka's Star System

References

External links

1956 manga
1971 manga
1983 anime OVAs
1984 anime OVAs
1985 anime OVAs
1986 anime OVAs
1991 anime OVAs
1993 anime OVAs
Anime series
Manga series
Osamu Tezuka anime
Osamu Tezuka manga
Shōnen manga
Shueisha franchises
Shueisha manga
Tezuka Productions